Sabina Classen ( Hirtz; born 27 December 1963) is a German thrash metal singer, best known as lead vocalist of Holy Moses and Temple of the Absurd.

Biography 
In 1981, Classen joined Holy Moses, where her then-husband Andy Classen was playing guitar, and in 1988 presented the heavy metal television program Mosh. After the break-up of Holy Moses in 1994, she formed the band Temple of the Absurd. The band released two albums and was disbanded in 2000. The same year, Holy Moses was reformed and is still functional.

Discography

With Holy Moses 
 Queen of Siam (1986)
 Finished with the Dogs (1987)
 The New Machine of Lichtenstein (1989)
 World Chaos (1990)
 Terminal Terror (1991)
 Reborn Dogs (1992)
 No Matter What's the Cause (1994)
 Master of Disaster (2001)
 Disorder of the Order (2002)
 Strength Power Will Passion (2005)
 Agony of Death (2008)
 Redefined Mayhem (2014)

With Temple of the Absurd 
 Absurd (1995)
 Mother, Creator, God (1999)

References

External links 

Official Holy Moses website
Holy Moses on stage 2008
show photos 2008
show photos 2006
show photos 1990

1963 births
German women singers
German heavy metal singers
Women heavy metal singers
Living people
People from Aachen